Basil Wrangell (born Basilio Petrovich von Wrangell) was an Italian film and television editor and director who worked in Hollywood from the 1920s through the 1970s.

Biography 
Basil was born at the Russian embassy in Ponte a Moriano, Italy, to Peter von Wrangell and Marussia Sasso-Ruffo. On his father's side, his family line had reportedly served as court attaches of old Russia since 1200 A.D. Basil's brother, George Wrangell, was a society columnist in New York City.

Basil attended the elite Grosvenor School in Nottingham, England, as a young man, until his family lost their wealth during the Russian Revolution. A chance opportunity to serve as an interpreter for Fred Niblo on Ben-Hur led to Basil traveling to America to take an entry-level job in a cutting room at a studio. He ended up becoming a proficient editor, eventually earning the chance to direct shorts and features. For television, he edited many episodes of I Spy, Peyton Place, Combat!, and Adventures in Paradise.

Selected filmography 
As editor:

The Only Way to Spy (1978)
Tobor the Great (1954)
Love Happy (1949)
The Good Earth (1937)
Whipsaw (1935)
Shadow of Doubt (1935)
Hide-Out (1934)
Hips, Hips, Hooray! (1934)
Aggie Appleby, Maker of Men (1933)
Midshipman Jack (1933)
Bed of Roses (1933)
Gabriel Over the White House (1933)
Ladies They Talk About (1933)
Freaks (1932)
Sidewalks of New York (1931)
Min and Bill (1930)
Love in the Rough (1930)
Let Us Be Gay (1930)
The Woman Racket (1930)
Marianne (1929)
The Voice of the City (1929)
All at Sea (1929)
The Cameraman (1928)
The Cardboard Lover (1928)
A Certain Young Man (1928)
The Latest from Paris (1928)
In Old Kentucky (1927)
Twelve Miles Out (1927)
California (1927)

As director:

South Seas Adventure (1958)
Heartaches (1947)
Philo Vance's Gamble (1947)

References 

Italian film editors
Italian film directors
1906 births
1977 deaths
Italian emigrants to the United States